The Laser is a class of single-handed, one-design sailing dinghies using a common hull design with three interchangeable rigs of different sail areas, appropriate to a given combination of wind strength and crew weight. Bruce Kirby designed the Laser in 1970 with an emphasis on simplicity and performance.

The Laser is a widely produced class of dinghies. As of 2018, there were more than 215,000 boats worldwide. It is an international class with sailors in 120 countries, and an Olympic class since 1996. Its wide acceptance is attributable to its robust construction, simple rig and ease of sailing that offer competitive racing due to tight class association controls which eliminate differences in hull, sails, and equipment.

The International Laser Class Association (ILCA) defines the specifications and competition rules for the boat, which is officially referred to as the ILCA Dinghy, due to a trademark dispute.

Other "Laser"-branded boats of related designs include the Laser 2 and Laser Pico.

Production

The Laser is manufactured by different companies in different regions. They include LaserPerformance in Europe and the Americas, Performance Sailcraft Australia in Oceania, and Performance Sailcraft Japan in Asia. In 2019, the Laser's status as an Olympic class was reviewed, and retained on the condition that the class complied with the Olympic equipment manufacturers (OEM) policy, allowing any suitably qualified manufacturer to supply boats and class equipment on a Fair, Reasonable and Non-Discriminatory (FRAND) basis. The move would potentially see a significant increase in the number of Laser producers.

Design
The boat's design began in 1969 with a phone call between Canadians Bruce Kirby and Ian Bruce. While discussing the possibility of a car-topped dinghy (a boat small enough to be carried on a roof rack of a typical car) for a line of camping equipment, Bruce Kirby sketched what would be known as "the million dollar doodle". The plans stayed with Kirby until 1970 when One Design and Offshore Yachtsman magazine held a regatta for boats under $1000, called "America's Teacup". Hans Fogh made the sail and helmed the prototype in the regatta. After a few sail modifications, the Laser easily won its class. The prototype was originally named the "Weekender"; the sail held the letters TGIF, a common American abbreviation for "Thank God it's Friday". In December 1970 Dave Balfour, a McGill engineering student, suggested the name Laser and contributed the Laser sail insignia. The Laser sailboat was officially unveiled at the New York Boat Show in 1971 where many purchase orders were placed.

Bruce and Kirby agreed to put the boat into production with Bruce manufacturing the craft and Kirby receiving royalties on each unit. As world-wide demand grew, they realized that regional licensing the manufacturing would deliver boats more economically than exporting them from Canada.

The Laser hull accommodates interchangeable rigs with different sail areas. This allows for a wide range of sailors to sail and compete in a range of wind conditions despite the Laser's small ideal crew weight range for a given rig. Three rigs are recognised by the International Laser Association: original Laser standard with a sail area of 7.06 m²; the Laser Radial with a sail area of 5.76 m²; and the Laser 4.7 with a sail area of 4.7 m².

The Laser's hull is constructed from fibreglass. The deck has a foam layer underneath for strength and buoyancy. The daggerboard is removable for storage and transport. The dinghy is manufactured by independent companies under licence in different parts of the world, including Performance Sailcraft Australia (Oceania) and Performance Sailcraft Japan.

As a one-design class of sailboat, all Lasers are built to the same specifications specified in the Laser Construction Manual. The association carries out inspections on manufacturers to ensure that boats are being made to the correct design. These factory specifications are the measurement of boats in a traditional sense. Sailors are prohibited from making any changes to the hull, sail, and spars unless specifically and positively permitted by the rules and are only allowed to use original parts. At regattas, boats are not measured, but rather inspected to ensure conformity with the rules.

The various sizes of Laser are all cat-rigged.

The Laser uses a Portsmouth Yardstick of 1097 for racing involving other classes. The equivalent yardstick in North America is the D-PN, which is 91.1 for a Laser.

The Laser is designed to be sailed single-handed although class rules permit two sailors.

Variants
Lasers can be rigged with a variety of rigs. Three of these rigs, the Standard, Radial and 4.7 are recognised by the International Laser Association, while other rigs have also been developed by third parties and are also available.

Laser Standard

The Laser Standard, or ILCA 7, is the original Laser rig. It has been sailed as the Olympic men's singlehanded dinghy since the 1996 Atlanta Olympics.

Laser Radial

In Europe the smaller Laser Radial, or ILCA 6, has surpassed the original Laser Standard sail in popularity and replaced the Europe Dinghy as the Women's Singlehanded Dinghy for the 2008 Olympics. The Radial uses the same hull and fittings as the Laser Standard, but has a smaller sail (5.8 m²) than the Standard with a different cut, and has a shorter lower mast section. The Laser Radial rig has a UK Portsmouth Yardstick number of 1139.

Laser 4.7

A smaller sail plan for the Laser, the Laser 4.7 or ILCA 4, was developed about a decade after the Laser Radial. The sail area was reduced by 35% from the Standard (from ) with a shorter, pre-bent bottom mast section, allowing even lighter sailors to sail it. The same formula as the Radial is kept. The hull is the same as the Standard and Radial. The Laser 4.7 rig has a UK Portsmouth Yardstick number of 1200.

Operational history
The Laser is raced worldwide from club levels to international and Olympic competitions.

Laser world championships are held in all three rigs and across junior, open, and masters age groups. In total in 2019, the Laser class association awarded 11 world championships. Places for world championships are limited due to high demand and are allotted to countries on the basis of the number of paid association members in each country.

In the Olympics, men race in Laser Standards and women race in Laser Radials.

Class association
The ILCA governs boat specifications and competition. The class association operates on four levels: the world level; a regional level based around continents; a district level based around states in the USA and Australia, and nations elsewhere; and at a local fleet level. The association plays a major role in ensuring conformity to Laser class rules worldwide.

Litigation
Bruce Kirby withdrew the license he had issued to LaserPerformance and later filed a lawsuit against LaserPerformance and Farzad Rastegar on March 4, 2013, claiming non-payment of design royalties.   Kirby also claims that the LaserPerformance boats have had issues with quality and parts availability. Kirby required the International Sailing Federation on March 25, 2013, to ask the International Laser Class Association to stop issuing ISAF license plaques to LaserPerformance (Europe) Limited, claiming that LaserPerformance were no longer a licensed builder. Instead ISAF and the ILCA issued a new plaque design, and changed the class rules so that a builder no longer needed to be licensed by Bruce Kirby.

Bruce Kirby Inc. has licensed the sailboat design under the new class name, "Kirby Torch", grandfathering Lasers bearing the "Bruce Kirby" plaque into the new class. On August 12, 2016, Bruce Kirby's claims were dismissed by the United States District Court for the District of Connecticut.

In 2019 the ILCA moved against Laser Performance  (the UK licensed builder which also owned the trademark on the Laser name) and withdrew its right to build officially measured boats.  The ILCA has chosen the new name of "ILCA Dinghy" for the boat.

In 2020, the United States District Court for the District of Connecticut found boat builder Quarter Moon (QMI) and LaserPerformance (Europe) Limited (LPE) liable for a sum of $6,857,736, payable to Kirby.

See also
Laser 2, a double-handed dinghy.
LaserPerformance, the manufacturer of many dinghies such as Laser Pico, Laser Stratos and the Laser.
Laser Pico, a small double-handed dinghy designed by Jo Richards in the 1990s mainly for family use
Laser 4.7
Laser 28
Laser Radial
Laser World Championships

Similar boats
Impulse (dinghy)
RS Aero
Phantom (dinghy)

References

External links
ILCA

 
Dinghies
Olympic sailing classes
Classes of World Sailing
1960s sailboat type designs
Sailboat type designs by Bruce Kirby
Sailboat types built by Performance Sailcraft